The 1968 United States Senate election in Georgia took place on November 5, 1968. Incumbent Democratic U.S. Senator Herman Talmadge was re-elected to a third consecutive term in office, winning large victories in the primary and general elections.

For the first time, Republicans held a primary election to nominate a candidate for U.S. Senate.

Democratic primary

Candidates
 Maynard Jackson, Atlanta attorney for the National Labor Relations Board
 Herman Talmadge, incumbent U.S. Senator since 1953

Results

Republican primary

Candidates
 E. Earl Patton, Fulton County businessman
 Jack Sells

Results

General election

Results

See also 
 1968 United States Senate elections

References

1968
Georgia
United States Senate